The Red Raiders is an extant 1927 American silent Western film directed by Albert S. Rogell and starring Ken Maynard. It was distributed by First National Pictures.

Cast
 Ken Maynard as Lt. John Scott
 Anne Drew as Jane Logan
 J. P. McGowan as Jane Logan
 Paul Hurst as Sgt. Murphy
 Harry Shutan as Izzy Epstein
 Ben Corbett as Cpl Clancy
 Tom Bay as Earl Logan
 Chief Yowlachie as Lone Wolf
 Tarzan as A Horse

Preservation status
The film survives at the Library of Congress, Filmoteca Espanola, Danish Film Archives and National Archives of Canada.

References

External links
 
 

1927 films
First National Pictures films
1927 Western (genre) films
American black-and-white films
Films directed by Albert S. Rogell
Silent American Western (genre) films
1920s English-language films
1920s American films